"Who Want Smoke?" is a song by American rapper Nardo Wick. It was released through Flawless Entertainment and RCA Records as a single on January 22, 2021. A remix, which features G Herbo, Lil Durk, and 21 Savage, was released on October 8, 2021. The original was certified platinum by the RIAA in November 2021. The song is included on Wick's debut album, Who Is Nardo Wick?, released on December 3, 2021.

The song gained attention for its lyrics "Who want smoke with me?" and "What the fuck is that?", and a stomping dance to the song went viral on TikTok.

Remix
On October 8, 2021, Nardo Wick released a remix of the song, featuring fellow American rappers G Herbo & Lil Durk and Atlanta-based rapper 21 Savage. The remix adds another question mark to the title and was released on G Herbo's 26th birthday. An accompanying music video, directed by Cole Bennett from Lyrical Lemonade, premiered on the same day.

Music videos
Two music videos were released for the song. The video for the original song was released alongside its release on January 22, 2021. The video for the remix directed by Cole Bennett was released alongside the song's release on October 8, 2021.

Charts

Weekly charts

Year-end charts

Certifications

References

2021 singles
2021 songs
G Herbo songs
Nardo Wick songs
Lil Durk songs
21 Savage songs
Songs written by Lil Durk
Songs written by 21 Savage
Music videos directed by Cole Bennett